The 2012 New Hampshire gubernatorial election took place on November 6, 2012, concurrently with the 2012 U.S. presidential election, U.S. House elections, and various state and local elections.

Four-term incumbent governor John Lynch was eligible to seek a fifth term.  In the fall of 2011, Lynch announced that he would retire rather than run for re-election.  On September 11, 2012, Democrat Maggie Hassan and Republican Ovide Lamontagne defeated primary opponents to win their parties' nominations. Hassan won the election while carrying every county in the state and began the two-year term on January 3, 2013.

Democratic primary

Candidates
 Jackie Cilley, former state Senator
 Maggie Hassan, former majority leader of the New Hampshire Senate
 Bill Kennedy, firefighter and retired Air Force officer

Declined
 Mark Connolly, former director of the New Hampshire's Bureau of Securities Regulation
 Tom Ferrini, mayor of Portsmouth
 Gary Hirshberg, chairman and former CEO of Stonyfield Farm
 John Lynch, incumbent governor
 Steve Marchand, former mayor of Portsmouth
 Phil McLaughlin, former state Attorney General
 Terry Shumaker, lawyer and former United States Ambassador to Trinidad and Tobago

Polling

Results

Republican primary

Candidates
 Ovide M. Lamontagne, attorney, nominee for governor in 1996 and candidate for the U.S. Senate in 2010
 Kevin H. Smith, conservative activist and former state Representative
 Robert Tarr

Declined
 Bill Binnie, businessman and candidate for the U.S. Senate in 2010
 Jeb Bradley, New Hampshire Senate Majority Leader and former U.S. Representative
 Peter Bragdon, state Senate President
 Ted Gatsas, Mayor of Manchester
 Steve Kenda, businessman
 John Lyons, chairman of the New Hampshire Board of Education
 John Stephen, former Health and Human Services Commissioner and Republican nominee for governor in 2010

Polling

Results

General election

Candidates
 John Babiarz (Libertarian), businessman and party nominee for governor in 2000, 2002, and 2010
 Maggie Hassan (D), former majority leader of the New Hampshire Senate
 Ovide Lamontagne (R), attorney, Republican nominee for governor in 1996, and candidate for the U.S. Senate in 2010

Debates
Complete video of debate, C-SPAN, September 14, 2012
Complete video of debate, C-SPAN, October 8, 2012

Predictions

Polling

With Cilley

With Smith

With Kennedy

With Bradley

With Connolly

With Gatsas

With Lynch

With Marchand

With Stephen

With Sununu

Results

References

External links
Election Division at the New Hampshire Secretary of State

Official campaign websites
John Babiarz for Governor
Jackie Cilley for Governor
Maggie Hassan for Governor
Ovide Lamontagne for Governor
Kevin Smith for Governor
Robert Tarr for Governor

2012 United States gubernatorial elections
Governor
2012